The redeye bass, redeye, or Coosa bass (Micropterus coosae) is a species of freshwater fish in the sunfish family (Centrarchidae) native to the Coosa River system of Georgia, Alabama. The waters it is normally found in are cool streams and rivers in the foothills of mountains.

Systematics 
In 2013, M. coosae was split into five species with M. coosae restricted to the Coosa River system.  M. cahabae of the Cahaba River system, M. chattahoochae of the Chattahoochee River system, M. tallapoosae of the Tallapoosa River system and M. warriorensis of the Black Warrior River system were all recognized as separate species.

Description 

The upper jaw (maxilla) extends to the back of the eye, which is usually red.  The redeye or Coosa bass is an elongate, slender fish with a large mouth that extends to or slightly behind the rear margin of the eye. The dorsal fin contains nine to 11 (usually 10) spines and 11 to 13 (usually 12) rays, and the area between the two is only slightly notched. The anal fin contains three spines and nine to 11 (usually 10) rays. The complete lateral line has from 63 to 74 scales. Scales above the lateral line number 12 or 13. A small tooth patch is present on the tongue. The back and sides are generally olive to brown with darker brown mottling. Adults have several horizontal rows of dark spots on the lower sides and venter. Breeding males have a light bluish green color on the lower head and throat. On juveniles, the sides of the body usually have 10 to 12 dark blotches that do not join to form a lateral stripe. The upper and lower margins of the caudal fin are edged in white, a useful feature for separating redeye bass from both smallmouth bass (Micropterus dolomieu) and shoal bass (M. cataractae).

Its main food tends to be insects.

The rock bass (Ambloplites rupestris), a distinct species of Centrarchid, is sometimes called the redeye or redeye bass in Canada.

As an introduced species
The redeye bass was introduced to California waters between 1962 and 1964 and is established in the Sisquoc River within the Santa Maria River basin.  Introduced Micropterus coosae have displaced native hardhead (Mylopharodon conocephalus) in the Cosumnes River.  Introduced redeye bass additionally pose a threat to California's endemic frogs and the California tiger salamander (Ambystoma californiense).

Elsewhere, the redeye bass was introduced to Tennessee in the 1950s and has hybridized extensively with native smallmouth bass (M. dolomieu).

References

Further reading
 
 
 

Micropterus
Fish described in 1940